Johnny Lee (born John Lee Ham; July 3, 1946) is an American country music singer. His 1980 single "Lookin' for Love" became a crossover hit, spending three weeks at number 1 on the Billboard country singles chart while also appearing in the top 5 on the Billboard Hot 100 chart and top 10 on Billboards Adult Contemporary chart. He racked up 17 top 40 country hits in the early and mid-1980s.

Biography
Lee was born in Texas City, Texas, and grew up on a dairy farm in nearby Alta Loma (now part of Santa Fe, Texas). In high school he formed a rock n' roll band, "Johnny Lee and the Roadrunners". After graduation, Lee enlisted in the United States Navy and served a tour of duty on the USS Chicago, a guided missile cruiser. After his discharge, he had his name legally changed from John Lee Ham to Johnny Lee. He played cover tunes in Texas nightclubs and bars throughout the late 1960s.

Lee worked 10 years with Mickey Gilley, both on tour and at Gilley’s Club in Pasadena, Texas. The soundtrack from the 1980 hit movie Urban Cowboy, which was largely shot at Gilley's, catapulted Lee to fame. The record spawned several hit singles, including "Lookin' for Love."

Lee also had five other songs reach the top of the Billboard magazine Hot Country Singles chart: "One in a Million" (1980), "Bet Your Heart on Me" (1981), "The Yellow Rose" (1984, a duet with Lane Brody and the theme song to the NBC TV-series of the same name), and "You Could Have Heard a Heartbreak" (1984). His other hits include "Pickin' Up Strangers" (1981), "Prisoner of Hope" (1981), "Cherokee Fiddle"(1982), "Sounds Like Love"(1982), "When You Fall In Love"(1982), "Be There For Me Baby"(1981), "Hey Bartender" (1983), "Rollin' Lonely"(1984), and "Save the Last Chance" (1985).

From 1982 to 1984, Lee was married to Dallas actress Charlene Tilton, with whom he had a daughter, Cherish (born 1982). He married his second wife, Deborah Spohr Lee, in 1986. The couple had a son, Johnny Lee Jr., in 1990 and divorced years later.  Deborah died November 7, 2002, after a long battle with prescription painkillers. After Johnny Lee Jr. died in 2014 at the age of 23 of a drug overdose, Lee became active in combating the illegal drug epidemic.

In the fall of 2008, Lee began performing regularly in Branson, Missouri.

Discography

Albums

Singles

Charted B-sides

Notes
A^ "Lookin' for Love" also peaked at No. 20 on the RPM Adult Contemporary Tracks chart and No. 54 on the RPM Top Singles chart in Canada.
B^ "Heart to Heart Talk" did not chart on Hot Country Songs, but peaked at No. 4 on Hot Country Radio Breakouts.

References

Other sources
 "Johnny Lee Biography". CMT.com. Retrieved May 27, 2005.
 "Johnny Lee - Biography". Official Johnny Lee Fan Club website. Retrieved May 27, 2005.
  Johnny Lee with Randy Wyles. 1989. Lookin' for love.  Diamond Books.

External links
 

1946 births
Living people
American country singer-songwriters
Place of birth missing (living people)
American male singer-songwriters
People from Houston
Asylum Records artists
Singer-songwriters from Texas
People from Texas City, Texas
Country musicians from Texas
People from Santa Fe, Texas